Donald Steele Potter (21 April 1902 – 7 June 2004) was an English sculptor, wood carver, potter and teacher.

Don Potter was born in Newington, near Sittingbourne, Kent, the son of a school teacher, and attended a private school. He joined the Wolf Cubs at the age of eight and became a keen participant in the scouting movement.

Career

Potter developed as a woodcarver, producing totem poles, gates and gateways. By the time Potter reached the age of twenty, the head of the Scouts, Baden-Powell himself, realized he was an expert craftsman. Potter camped at Baden-Powell's house at Pax Hill near Bentley, Hampshire and undertook carving commissions for him. He used very old local fallen oaks, said to be 1,200 years old. For the 1929 World Jamboree, Potter designed totem poles for the British Dominions of Australia, Canada, India, South Africa and New Zealand. A granite statue of Baden-Powell by Potter in 1960 is now located in front of Baden-Powell House in London.

As well as wood carving, Potter started to work in stone as well and met Jacob Epstein (who had studied with Auguste Rodin in Paris). In 1931, he approached Eric Gill and asked to study under him. Gill was an engraver, designer of typefaces and sculptor, with carvings in Westminster Cathedral. Initially, Potter was on a six-month trial, but he remained as Gill's pupil for six years. He worked with Gill on sculptures at the Midland Hotel, Morecambe. While with Gill, he undertook wood carving, including the panels for the doors for the Rare Books Room of 1934 in the Radcliffe Science Library (University of Oxford), the crucifixion for the altar of the St Peter the Apostle church (Gorleston-on-Sea, Norfolk), and a crucifix in the woods at Pigotts where Gill was based near High Wycombe.

In addition to being a sculptor, Potter spent his later career as a teacher at Bryanston School in Dorset (1940–1984), responsible for both sculpture and pottery. During World War II, Sir Terence Conran was inspired by him as one of his pupils. Potter continued to undertake commissions during his time as a teacher, including some for the School. For instance, examples of stone carvings undertaken by him in 1991 can be seen at a local church in the village of Durweston.

The porch of Our Lady of Grace and St Teresa of Avila RC Church in Chingford has oak panels depicting animals and fish that Potter carved in 1956. A major work was the granite statue of Robert Baden-Powell (1960–61), located outside Baden-Powell House in Queen's Gate, South Kensington, London.

The Don Potter Art School at Bryanston School, opened during October 1997 in his presence, is named after him.

Gallery

References

External links

 
 
 
 
 

1902 births
2004 deaths
English potters
English woodcarvers
English centenarians
Men centenarians
Schoolteachers from Dorset
English sculptors
English male sculptors
People from Newington, Swale
Scouting pioneers
20th-century British sculptors
20th-century English artists
20th-century English educators
20th-century ceramists
20th-century English male artists